The Corinthian can refer to:
Corinthian (comics), a character in The Sandman comic books
The Corinthian (Manhattan), an apartment building in New York City
The Corinthian (novel), a 1940 book by Georgette Heyer